Zerafa is a surname. Notable people with the surname include:

 Benigno Zerafa (1726–1804), Maltese composer
 Francesco Zerafa (1679–1758), Maltese architect
 Jamie Zerafa (born 1998), Maltese football midfielder
 Jesmond Zerafa (born 1965), Maltese professional footballer
 Joseph Zerafa (born 1988), Maltese international footballer
 Michael Zerafa (born 1992), Australian professional boxer

Maltese-language surnames